This article is a list of free-to-air channels in New Zealand.

New Zealand broadcast channels 
Notes
 The PAL-B&G (analogue) television switch off was completed on 1 December 2013. AM and FM radio is unaffected.
 DVB 64-QAM terrestrial channels use ITU system G channel allocations within UHF television band IV and band V. On 1 December 2013, Band V above 698 MHz was reallocated to LTE mobile telephony, hence some channels that were broadcasting on Band V above 698 MHz on 30 November 2013 have been forced off air until a new frequency is allocated.
 All digital terrestrial television channels are encoded in H.264 and subject to a MPEG-LA controlled transmission patent licensing tax which is in included in the Freeview broadcaster cost and varies on viewership figures.
 High-definition 1080i DVB 64-QAM are only available on TVNZ 1, TVNZ 2, Three, Whakaata Māori, TVNZ Duke, Prime and The Edge TV. All other TV channels are standard-definition 576i anamorphic widescreen.
 Metro means Kordia owned sites only in Auckland, Hamilton, Tauranga, Napier/Hastings, Palmerston North, the Wellington metropolitan area (including Kapiti), Christchurch and Dunedin.
 A grey box in the 64-QAM column means the channel(s) is temporarily off-air.
 All New Zealand operated direct-broadcast satellite channels are from Optus D1 at 160.0°E, and can be received via a standard 60 cm parabolic antenna. There are two main up-links - the original one from Sky in Auckland, on transports 3 @ 12519 MHz, 5 @ 12644 MHz or 6 @ 12671 MHz and the one from TVNZ's Avalon comm hub in Lower Hutt, with channels broadcast on either Freeview transport 21 @ 12456 MHz or 22 @ 12483 MHz.
 IPTV resolution is generally better than 576i due to not being scaled to an anamorphic widescreen width of 720, but may be lower depending on the bandwidth selected or calculated at the time of connection.  Playback performance may vary with network traffic conditions. Most metropolitan New Zealanders have access to fiber broadband.

Foreign satellite channels 
The following is a list of free-to-air DVB satellite services available in New Zealand. Most New Zealand homes already have a standard 60 cm satellite dish fitted which can pick up most of these channels, as these are also used (or have been used in the past) to pick up free-to-air and pay New Zealand television channels from Optus D1 (and historically, Optus B1).  A frequency scanning (aka blind-scan) capable set-top box can be used to locate other services.

See also 
 Australasian television frequencies
 Television in New Zealand

References

External links 
TV transmitter details: click on area then transmitter symbol

Television in New Zealand
New Zealand television-related lists